Titeuf (known sometimes as Tootuff in English) is a French comic series created by Swiss comic books creator Zep in 1992, which was adapted into a 2001 animated TV series and a 2011 film of the same name. It also appears in the dedicated Franco-Belgian comics magazine Tchô!.

Publication history
Titeuf was initially published in the fanzine Sauve qui peut ("Run for your lives") and noticed by Glénat executive Jean-Claude Camano. Zep joined Glénat in 1992 and Titeuf eventually became one of France's most popular comics. The first Titeuf book Dieu, le sexe et les bretelles (God, Sex And Suspenders) appeared in 1993 and sold only a few thousand copies, but the subsequent books gradually won over a colossal readership, and the series is now considered the greatest moneymaker in the French comics market. The series was adapted into an Italian-French animated TV series in 2001, initially broadcast on Canal J. By 2008, Titeuf was the comic series with by far the largest publication in France, with over 1.8 million copies per year, three times the number of the second most popular series, with it being translated to various languages such as Spanish, Italian, Russian, and Chinese, among others.

Characters 
Main
 Titeuf: the main character. He is a 10-year-old boy with a blonde cowlick. His best friends are Manu, Hugo, Jean Claude and Vominator. Voiced by Dan Russell.
 Roger: Titeuf's father. He is 35 years old. He often scolds Titeuf. Voiced by Bob Saker.
 Anne-Mathilde: Titeuf's mother. She is 33 years old. She wears a black turtleneck and a pair of tan pants. Voiced by Megg Nicol.
 Zizie: Titeuf's cute little sister. She first appears in the seventh book. She always cries. She is 1 years old.
 Aunt Monica: Titeuf's ugly, depressed aunt. She is a blonde-haired woman, and she first appears in the second book. Voiced by Dian Perry.
 Julie: Titeuf's cute little cousin. She first appears in the fourth book. She is a cheerful, fun loving 9 year old. She is at first angry with Titeuf, but then both laugh. She kisses Titeuf on the cheek in the end, showing that they love each other very much. She wears a pink (purple in her first appearance) hoodie, lilac (tan in her first appearance) pants, green and black (indigo and purple in her first appearance) striped socks and dark pink shoes. She has red hair. In one episode of Season 1 she goes to the mall with Titeuf and in another she sleeps with him. In Season 3 she cries because Big Nearsighted stole her phone and punched her in the back. She is smarter than Titeuf and is a bit tomboyish, but they still care for each other. 
 Pépé: Titeuf's grandfather.
 Glaieul: Titeuf's uncle who is in a wheelchair and tells tall tales.
Recurring
 Manu: Titeuf’s idiotic best friend from school, he has black hair, a big nose, and wears glasses.
 Jean-Claude: Is a boy with a lisp because of his front teeth with braces. He has black hair, and big eyebrows.
 Nadia: Is Titeuf’s crush, but she doesn’t like him. She has a ponytail, and has big lips. She is cute. She wears red shoes and white socks. In one episode, she is pushed by Hugo, who takes one of her shoes and socks and throws them at Titeuf. Voiced by Jules De Jongh.
 Hugo: Is a bully and a friend at the same time, he is big, and has red hair. He is usually scolded by his father, who is an Italian truck driver.
 François: Is a boy who also wears glasses, and has a long nose. He is Titeuf's smart friend.
 Vominator: Is also a redhead who vomits a lot, that’s why his name is Vominator. He has a pet hamster named Moulinus.
 Dumbo: Is Nadia’s best friend with pigtails. Voiced by Dian Perry.
 Tim: Is a black boy who wears a green hoodie. 
 Ramatou: Is a black tall and lanky girl who is Titeuf’s new girlfriend, she wears a green cap, and a light blue tank top.
 The Mistress: Is Titeuf’s unnamed elderly teacher, who is very strict. 
 Morvax: Is a character who always sneezes.
 Maxime: Titeuf's Muslim friend who is discriminated by anti-Muslims. He first appears in the eleventh book. He is not allowed to eat pork.
 Romuald: Is a 7 year old who has blue hair and wears glasses. He is the smartest student in Titeuf's school. He is even smarter than François.
 Therese: Is a stupid girl with pink hair.
 Moulinus: Is Vominator's aggressive hamster.
 Marco: A 13 years old hypocrite who is the son of a factory worker. In one episode, he has a crush on Julie.
 Basil: An autistic boy who speaks weirdly. Titeuf thinks he is an alien.
 The Bosnian Boy: Titeuf teaches him to swear in French and the teacher scolds him.
 Robert: A boy who appears in the fourth book.
 Nathalie: A nerdy girl.
 Ramone: A spaniard who is laughed at just because he can't speak proper French.
 Élie: A jew who is not allowed to eat pork.
 Samuel: A boy who is pranked by Titeuf and his friends.
 Milos: A Croatian pacifist. 
 Puduk: He is named like that because he farts. 
 Ze t'aime: A 6 years old girl with a mouth that looks like a duck bill, who loves Titeuf, who yells at her and makes her cry. 
 Big Nearsighted: A thief who steals the phones and the money of the main characters.
 Big Diego: A bully who beats Titeuf up. His plan is thwarted by Vominator's hamster, Moulinus. He wears green sneakers.
 Musclor: Titeuf's gymnastics teacher.
 Jean Do: Titeuf's art teacher.
 Pauline: A girl who, because of cancer, is bald and is forced to wear a hat. Hugo laughs at her, but Titeuf punches him and defends her, prompting her to kiss him on the cheek. 
 Dimi: A Polish boy who can't tie his shoes.

English history
Translated as Tootuff, it appeared for a short while during 2005 in The Dandy comic in the UK, with the books being translated as-well (though they retained the original "Titeuf" title). The animated series was dubbed into English and aired on GMTV's Toonattik in the UK, Starz Kids & Family in the US, CBC Television's Kids' CBC in Canada, Nickelodeon in Southeast Asia and Cartoon Network and ABC3 in Australia & New Zealand.

Bibliography 
 Dieu, le sexe et les bretelles (God, sex and Suspenders), 1993
 L'Amour, c'est pô propre... (Love isn't clean), 1993	
 Ça épate les filles... (It impresses the girls), 1994	
 C'est pô juste... (It's unfair), 1995	
 Titeuf et le derrière des choses (The rear side of things), 1996	
 Tchô, monde cruel (Howdy, cruel world), 1997	
 Le miracle de la vie (The miracle of life), 1998	
 Lâchez-moi le slip ! (Get off my case!), 2000	
 La loi du préau (The law of the playground), 2002
 Nadia se marie, (Nadia's wedding), 2004	
 Mes meilleurs copains (My best friends), 2006
 Le sens de la vie (The meaning of life), 2008
 À la folie (Folly !), 2012
 Bienvenue en adolescence (Welcome to adolescence), 2015
 À fond le slip ! (In the panties), 2017
 Petite poésie des saisons (Little poetry of the seasons), 2019
 La Grande Aventure (The Great Adventure), 2021

There was also a book entitled "Le Guide du zizi sexuel", a sex ed book based on the franchise published by Glénat editions, was released in 2001. It is a short guide with educational and humorous vocation, intended to answer the questions posed by pre-teens about love and sex.

Film

In 2011 Titeuf le film was released in theaters.

Games
The franchise has seen many video games released over the years.

2000's
In the 2000s, Infogrames/Atari held the video game license to the franchise. These games were only released in European territories.

The first game, simply titled Titeuf, was released for the Game Boy Color in 2001. Developed by Planet Interactive, It is a party game that plays similar to the Mario Party franchise. The game was released outside France as Tootuff.

The next game - Titeuf: Ze Gag Machine, was released for the Game Boy Advance in 2002, developed by Teddy Sday 3D Light Team. It was only released in France in French, but an English version under the name Tootuff: The Gag Machine also exists, leading that the game was  going to be released internationally as well.

The first console and PC game based on the comic - Titeuf: Mega-Compet, was released for the PlayStation 2 and Microsoft Windows in September 2004. Developed by Eden Games, this title contains a selection of minigames all connected together with a storyline. The PS2 version also has minigames that support the EyeToy Camera. A separate Game Boy Advance version developed by Dream On Studio was also released. All three versions were only available in France and are French-only.

In 2005, the character's first Nintendo DS game - Titeuf: Mission Nadia, was released, developed again by Dream On Studio. It is another minigame compilation that combines various genres of its type. It was released outside France as Tootuff: Mission Nadia

In 2007, Le Monde de Titeuf and Le Monde de Nadia were released for the Nintendo DS, once more developed by Dream On Studio. Both titles were 3D action-adventure games with minigames as well, although each version having a different selection of minigames. They were released outside France as Tootuff's World and Nadia's World.

In 2008, the last Titeuf games from Atari were released - Titeuf Mégafunland and Nadia Mégafunland, again developed by Dream On Studio. They were also 3D action-adventure games with separate minigames for each title. Both titles were only released in France, but the game can be played in English as well.

2010's
In 2011, a game based on Titeuf, le Film was released for the Wii, Microsoft Windows and the Nintendo DS which like with Mega Compet''', consisted of many minigames. It was published by Deep Silver and developed by Tate Interactive. Like with Mega Compet', the game was only released in France.

In November 2019, Microids released a remaster of Titeuf Mega-Compet titled Titeuf: Mega Party for the PlayStation 4, Xbox One, Nintendo Switch, Microsoft Windows and macOS. For the first time, the game was released in North America in addition to Europe, under the title of Mega Party - a Tootuff Adventure'' in English, with a new English translation and dub. The French release retained its 7+ rating, while the English release was increased to 12+ due to the game's content.

Other
There were also two Titeuf board games called "The Overmégamortel game" and "Titeuf: zizi sexuel le jeu" were released in 2008.

Sources

 Titeuf albums Bedetheque 

Footnotes

External links
 Titeuf (animated series) on imdb
 Titeuf official site 
 Tchô! official site 

Swiss comic strips
Fictional Swiss people
Child characters in comics
Male characters in comics
1992 comics debuts
Comics characters introduced in 1992
School-themed comics
Swiss comics characters
Swiss comics titles
DC Thomson Comics strips
Belgian children's animated comedy television series
French children's animated comedy television series
Italian children's animated comedy television series
Comics adapted into animated series
Comics adapted into television series
Comics adapted into animated films
French comics adapted into films
Comics adapted into video games
Television series by Saban Entertainment